Roma Mae Cañedo Apa-ap (born April 5, 2002), professionally known as Golden Cañedo, is a Filipino singer, actress, and performer. She is the first grand winner of The Clash. Right after winning the said reality-singing competition, Golden joined the cast of the late-night musical-variety show of GMA Network, Studio 7, in 2018. She is currently among the mainstay performers of the Sunday musical program All-Out Sundays.

She is the "Ballad Princess" of her generation.

Discography

Singles

Filmography

Television

Television show

Television guesting

References

External links 
 
 Sparkle GMA Artist Center profile

2002 births
Living people
Filipino women pop singers
21st-century Filipino singers
Singers from Metro Manila
Participants in Philippine reality television series
Reality show winners
GMA Network personalities
GMA Music artists
People from Cebu City
21st-century Filipino women singers
Filipino television variety show hosts